İhsan Hakan (1965, in Ankara – 1 November 1993, in Ankara), also known as Mustafa Deniz, was a PKK defector who was killed, according to some as part of a cover-up of the suspected assassination of general Eşref Bitlis, in a mysterious plane crash.

Controversy
A so-called "repentant militant" (i.e., defector of the PKK) and PKK informer, Hakan was given the code name "Mustafa Deniz" and assumed a new existence. In June 1993 he co-founded an Ankara-based film and video company.

On 1 November 1993 he disappeared, and on 4 November his corpse was found in the vicinity of Avcılar Village of Polatlı District of Ankara, shot dead by a bullet to his head, while the bodies of gendarmerie commander Cem Ersever and his girlfriend Nevval Boz were found elsewhere.

References 

1965 births
1993 deaths
Members of the Kurdistan Workers' Party
Apoists